Jacques Cartier State Park is a  state park located in the Town of Morristown in St. Lawrence County, New York.  The park is located on the south bank of the St. Lawrence River.

The park offers a beach, picnic tables, playground, hiking, fishing, a boat launch and docks. The park also features a campground with both tent and trailer sites, including bathroom facilities and showers. Cross-country skiing and ice-fishing is permitted during the winter, and seasonal waterfowl and deer hunting is allowed with permits.

See also
 List of New York state parks

References

External links
 New York State Parks: Jacques Cartier State Park

State parks of New York (state)
Parks in St. Lawrence County, New York